The Clara Simpson Three-Decker is a historic triple decker house in Worcester, Massachusetts.  It is one of the older triple deckers in the Piedmont section of the city, built c. 1888.  It follows a typical side hall plan, and has a jog on the side wall.  It has a hip roof, which hangs over the house in typical Italianate fashion, with decorative brackets.  The single story front porch extends the width of the house, and is supported by turned columns with heavy decorative brackets.

The house was listed on the National Register of Historic Places in 1990.

See also
National Register of Historic Places listings in southwestern Worcester, Massachusetts
National Register of Historic Places listings in Worcester County, Massachusetts

References

Apartment buildings in Worcester, Massachusetts
Apartment buildings on the National Register of Historic Places in Massachusetts
Italianate architecture in Massachusetts
Houses completed in 1888
Triple-decker apartment houses
National Register of Historic Places in Worcester, Massachusetts